KMZZ (106.9 FM, La Ley 106.9) is a radio station broadcasting a Regional Mexican music format. Licensed to Bishop, Texas, United States, the station serves the Corpus Christi area.  The station is currently owned by Claro Communications, Ltd.

History
The station was assigned the call letters KFLZ on June 20, 1980.  On June 14, 2005, the station changed its call sign to the current KMZZ.

References

External links

MZZ